19 to Zero is a not-for-profit science communications initiative based in Calgary, Alberta. Hosted at the University of Calgary, the public–private partnership is made up of around 500 members including public health specialists, academics, behavioural psychologists, marketers and multimedia creators. Its purpose is to increase confidence in vaccines for COVID-19 and other diseases by tackling vaccine hesitancy. The group publishes materials on its website and through partner organizations, including videos, billboards, presentations, brochures and in-person events.

History

Founding 
19 to Zero was launched in August 2020 at the University of Calgary in order to influence the behaviour of the general public surrounding public health measures and COVID-19 vaccines. The group's primary goal is to increase vaccine uptake in order to meet immunization targets, working to coordinate messaging among health care workers across Canada.

19 to Zero and the University of Toronto conducted a survey in the fall of 2020 to gauge routine vaccination rates following the COVID-19 pandemic.

Community activation 
On March 12, 2021, 19 to Zero hosted a webinar on vaccine hesitancy and COVID-19 conspiracy theories led by members of the Ontario COVID-19 Science Advisory Table, Queen's University, University of Waterloo and Alberta Children's Hospital. A fundraiser led by the University of Calgary raised $86,825 towards supporting 19 to Zero's efforts against COVID-19 misinformation, falling short of its $100,000 goal. Beginning in April 2021, the Calgary chapter of the World Economic Forum's Global Shapers initiative supported 19 to Zero by hosting town hall sessions on COVID-19 vaccines. 

Some of 19 to Zero's community engagement activities included handing out postcards with QR codes linking to available vaccination appointments.

In August 2021, Shoppers Drug Mart announced it was providing funding to 19 to Zero in order to increase delivery of COVID-19 vaccines to target hesitant populations. 19 to Zero also partnered with Suncor Energy, who contributed $150,000 to coordinate a local vaccination campaign. In October 2021, the group launched a new behaviour change campaign called "It's Never Too Late" following an "unprecedented surge" of admissions to intensive care units in Alberta. The campaign video was produced with to increase "stalled" vaccination rates, and was accompanied by billboard advertisements.

Following Health Canada's approval of COVID-19 vaccines for children aged 6 months to 11 years old, 19 to Zero participated in an advertising campaign called "Max the Vax" alongside the Canadian Medical Association, York Region and the Ontario Association of Children's Aid Societies. In 2022, 19 to Zero received a $319,333 grant from the Public Health Agency of Canada's Immunization Partnership Fund to enhance the role of schools in promoting vaccine acceptance among students, their families and teachers.

Organization

Leadership 
19 to Zero is led by Jia Hu, a Medical Officer of Health with Alberta Health Services. Hu is medical director in the Canadian division of Cleveland Clinic, having previously worked at McKinsey & Company consulting in the healthcare and pharmaceutical sectors. He sits on the Board of Directors for Partners In Health Canada, and has worked during the COVID-19 pandemic to ramp up testing, risk communications and contact tracing. He also developed a contact tracing app funded by Alberta Innovates, and published research on behaviour change strategies towards increasing uptake of COVID-19 vaccines among children and other target populations.

19 to Zero's Vice Chair is Rachel Bensler, a student at the University of Alberta.

Partners 
19 to Zero is partnered with government, academic and corporate organizations. The group leads the Canadian arm of the "COVID-19 New Vaccine Information, Communication, and Engagement" (CONVINCE) Initiative, a global collaboration between the CUNY Graduate School of Public Health & Health Policy, the London School of Hygiene and Tropical Medicine's Vaccine Confidence Project, and Wilton Park, an executive agency of the Foreign, Commonwealth and Development Office in the United Kingdom. 19 to Zero is a participating member of the Faster, Together vaccine promotion initiative. 

19 to Zero partnered with IV.AI to analyze online social media conversations in order to generate models to combat misinformation and collect information about vaccine hesitancy narratives. The organization also provided support for the first mobile vaccination clinic in Alberta led by Alberta Health and the Business Council of Alberta. The Alberta Federation of Regulated Health Professionals lists 19 to Zero as one of its COVID-19 resource providers. Additional partners include:

Sponsors 
As a not-for-profit organization, 19 to Zero's activities are funded by government grants, corporate sponsorship and in-kind donations. Financial supporters include Alberta Children's Hospital, Alberta Health Services, Alberta Innovates, Canadian Institutes of Health Research, City University of New York, GlaxoSmithKline, Hill+Knowlton Strategies, Kantar Group, Pfizer, Sanofi, Shaw, McMaster University, Moderna, Ontario College of Pharmacists, University of Calgary, University of Toronto, Western Economic Diversification and Women's College Hospital.

References

External links 

 Official website
Health communication
Canadian health activists
Vaccine hesitancy
Misinformation
Public relations
COVID-19 misinformation
COVID-19